Motilla del Palancar is a municipality in Cuenca, Castile-La Mancha, Spain. It has a population of 5,224.

Notable people
 José Luis Olivas, Spanish politician of the People's Party. He was named the third president of the Generalitat Valenciana (the first not to have been chosen in elections)

Municipalities in the Province of Cuenca